NGC 1998 (also known as ESO 204-15, PGC 17434) is a lenticular galaxy located in the Pictor constellation. It was discovered by John Herschel on December 28, 1834 and is about 207 million light-years from the Milky Way. Its apparent magnitude is 14.3. and its size is 0.90 by 0.5 arc minutes. In some sources such as SIMBAD, it is misidentified as nearby double star NGC 1995.

References

Lenticular galaxies
1998
204-15
17434
Pictor (constellation)
Astronomical objects discovered in 1834
Discoveries by John Herschel